The 18th International Emmy Awards took place on November 19, 1990 New York City. The award ceremony, presented by the International Academy of Television Arts and Sciences (IATAS), honors all programming produced and originally aired outside the United States.

Ceremony 
The International Emmy Awards are presented annually by the International Academy of Television Arts and Sciences (IATAS). In addition to the programming categories, the International Academy awards world television personalities with the Directorate Award and the Founder Award, presented to Henrikas Yushkiavitshus and Joan Ganz Cooney, respectively.

Winners

Best Arts Documentary 
 Book mark: from Moscow to Pietushk (United Kingdom: BBC)

Best Children & Young People 
 Living with Dinosaurs (United Kingdom: Channel 4)

Best Documentary 
 J'ai Douze Ans et Je Fais la Guerre (France: Capa/Canal+/France 3)

Best Drama 
 First and Last (United Kingdom: BBC)

Best Performing Arts 
 The Mahabharata (United Kingdom: Channel 4)

Best Popular Arts 
 Norbert Smith: A Life (United Kingdom: Channel 4)

References

External links 
 

International Emmy Awards ceremonies
International
International